Barzio (Valsassinese ) is a comune (municipality) in the Province of Lecco in the Italian region Lombardy, located in the Valsassina about  northeast of Milan and about  northeast of Lecco.

Twin towns
 Magland, France

References

Cities and towns in Lombardy
Valsassina